Rapamycin-insensitive companion of mammalian target of rapamycin (RICTOR) is a protein that in humans is encoded by the RICTOR gene.

RICTOR and mTOR are components of a protein complex that integrates nutrient- and growth factor-derived signals to regulate cell growth.

Structure 
The gene RICTOR is located on chromosome 5 at 5p13.1 with a sequence length of 5440 bp, oriented on the minus strand. The translated RICTOR protein contains 1709 amino acids and is present in the cytosol. RICTOR contains few conserved regions and function domains of RICTOR have yet to be observed.  However, using liquid chromatography-tandem mass spectrometry analysis, 21 phosphorylation sites were identified on RICTOR. Of these sites, T1135 has been shown to undergo growth factor-responsive phosphorylation via S6K1.

Function 
RICTOR is a subunit of the mammalian target of rapamycin complex 2 (mTORC2) which contains mTOR, GβL, RICTOR (this protein) and mSIN1.

The mammalian target of rapamycin (mTOR) is a highly conserved Ser/Thr kinase that regulates cell growth and proliferation.

mTOR may exist as mTOR complex 1 (mTORC1) or mTOR complex 2 (mTORC2). RICTOR is a key component of mTORC2, which, unlike mTORC1, is not directly inhibited by rapamycin. mTORC2, and RICTOR, specifically, has been shown to phosphorylate Akt/protein kinase B (PKB) on SER473. This phosphorylation activates Akt/PKB, where deregulation of Akt/PKB has been implicated in cancer and diabetes.

RICTOR and mTORC2 have been shown to play an essential role in embryonic growth and development, perhaps due to the control that mTORC2 exerts on actin cytoskeleton organization.

Regulation 
FoxO transcription factors can activate expression of RICTOR. FoxO has been shown to inhibit mTORC1, while activating Akt through RICTOR elevation.

Degradation 
Perifosine has been shown to interfere with mTOR activity by degrading its components, such as RICTOR.

Interactions 
RICTOR has been shown to interact with and play a role in:

Clinical relevance 

Diseases associated with mutation in the RICTOR gene include foramen magnum meningioma and syringomyelia. Akt/PMB activation is also involved in glucose metabolism and activation of Akt by RICTOR has been shown to mediate glucose and lipid metabolism. Therefore, the influence of RICTOR and mTORC2 on Akt signaling has been associated with insulin resistance and type 2 diabetes.

Cancer 
Akt/PMB activation leads to proliferation and survival, therefore over-activation of the Akt/PMB pathway by mTORC2 (including RICTOR) is implicated in cancerous growth.

In human colorectal carcinoma, RICTOR has been shown to association with FBXW7 (outside of mTORC2) to mediate the ubiquitination of growth-promoting factors cyclin E and c-Myc. Furthermore, elevated growth factor signaling may suppress the ubiquitinating action of RICTOR-FBXW7, resulting in accumulation of cyclin E and c-Myc and subsequent progression through the cell cycle.

In glioblastoma (GBM), RICTOR(along with EGFR) may serve as an effective therapeutic target for silencing RNA, leading to decreased cell proliferation. Co-silencing of RICTOR and EGFR lead to increased sensitivity to alkaloids and alkylating agents. For one particular PTEN-mutant cell line, co-silencing resulted in tumor eradication.

RICTOR has been shown to be significantly overexpressed in well-differentiated leiomyosarcomas. Due to the influence of RICTOR on actin polymerization, RICTOR could play a role in allowing transcription and subsequent differentiation in these muscle cells.

mTOR subunits RICTOR and RAPTOR both showed increased expression, which increased with pituitary adenoma tumor staging. Therefore, mTOR, RPTOR and RICTOR were significantly correlated with the growth and invasion of pituitary adenomas and may have an important predictive and prognostic value in such patients.

See also 
RPTOR
mTORC2

References

Further reading